The Tamaricales are an obsolete order of dicotyledons. This order has been abandoned by the most recent systems, and the three families in the order have been distributed to other orders:
 family Tamaricaceae, now in the Caryophyllales;
 family Frankeniaceae, now in the Caryophyllales;
 family Fouquieriaceae, now in the Ericales.

References

Historically recognized angiosperm orders